Opa  were an American jazz fusion band made up of Uruguayan members. They started in the 1970s, and released two albums in the US: Goldenwings (Milestone Records M-9069, 1976) 
and Magic Time (Milestone Records M-9078, 1977). Both were produced by Brazilian musician and composer Airto Moreira.

The band consisted of Hugo Fattoruso, George Fattoruso and Hugo "Ringo" Thielmann, plus guest artists Hermeto Pascoal, David Amaro, Barry Finnerty, Flora Purim, Ruben Rada, Gary Gazaway, Jose Pedro Beledo, etc.
Opa had played on previous albums by Airto Moreira, like Fingers (CTI Records CTL 18), released in 1973, and Deodato/Airto in concert (CTI Records CTI 6041), released in 1974.

Band members 
 Hugo Fattoruso - keyboards, vocals
 George (Osvaldo) Fattoruso - drums
 Hugo "Ringo" Thielmann - bass, vocals

Guest artists 
 Hermeto Pascoal - flute, percussion
 David Amaro - guitar
 Barry Finnerty - guitar
 Airto Moreira - percussion
 Flora Purim - vocals
 Ruben Rada - percussion, vocals
 Jorge Fattoruso - percussion, drums, vocals
 Gary Gazaway
 Jose Pedro Beledo

Discography 

 Back Home (1975, OPA's demo tape recorded with a four-track Teac 3440 by Larry Rosen in July–August 1975 at 'Holly Place Studio' (NY), released in 1996)
 Goldenwings (Milestone, 1976)
 Magic Time (Milestone, 1977)
 A Los Shakers Otroshakers (Sazam, 1981)
 Opa en vivo (Orfeo, 1988)
 Opa en vivo 87' & rarities (2001)

Awards

 6 golden records (given by Discolandia)
 1 golden record (given by Musart, México D.F)
 4 platinum records (Discolandia)

References

External links
Opa biography and discography at AllMusic.com
Opa discography at Discogs.com

Brazilian jazz ensembles
American jazz ensembles
Milestone Records artists
Uruguayan rock music groups
Musical groups established in 1969